Jonathan Aspas Juncal (born 28 February 1982) is a Spanish former professional footballer. Mainly a right midfielder, he could also appear as a right-back.

Club career
Born in Moaña, Province of Pontevedra, Aspas was brought up through local RC Celta de Vigo's youth system, and made his debut with the first team on 10 December 1999, aged 17, in a meaningless UEFA Cup tie against S.L. Benfica in Lisbon (Celta had already won 7–0 in the first leg, and he came on as a substitute for Benni McCarthy in the 1–1 draw). On 23 November 2003, his first La Liga game came, a 2–0 home loss against Athletic Bilbao. During that season, which ended in relegation, he also appeared in an infamous 5–0 derby defeat to Deportivo de La Coruña also at the Balaídos.

Subsequently, Aspas would be regularly used by the Galicians, while the club was again relegated from the top flight in 2007. He moved abroad afterwards, joining Italy's Piacenza Calcio 1919.

With the new technical staff of R.E. Mouscron – coach Miroslav Đukić and director of football Amedeo Carboni – playing a major part in his signing, Aspas moved to the Belgian League for the 2009–10 campaign. However, after only four months, the club could not face surmounting financial problems, and folded.

Aspas resumed his career in the Cypriot First Division, with AEP Paphos FC and Alki Larnaca FC. In July 2014, he returned to his native region by signing for Segunda División B team Racing de Ferrol after a trial.

In the 2015 off-season, Aspas returned to Italy and the city of Piacenza, joining A.S. Pro Piacenza 1919. At the end of his contract, he moved to local amateurs ASD Nibbiano & Valtidone.

Personal life
Aspas' younger brother, Iago, was also a footballer; both were groomed at Celta. Their cousin Aitor represented smaller teams in their native region.

Career statistics

Honours
Celta
UEFA Intertoto Cup: 2000

Spain U16
UEFA European Under-16 Championship: 1999

References

External links

1982 births
Living people
Spanish footballers
Footballers from Moaña
Association football midfielders
La Liga players
Segunda División players
Segunda División B players
Celta de Vigo B players
RC Celta de Vigo players
Pontevedra CF footballers
Racing de Ferrol footballers
Serie B players
Serie C players
Piacenza Calcio 1919 players
Belgian Pro League players
R.E. Mouscron players
Cypriot First Division players
AEP Paphos FC players
Alki Larnaca FC players
Spain youth international footballers
Spanish expatriate footballers
Expatriate footballers in Italy
Expatriate footballers in Belgium
Expatriate footballers in Cyprus
Spanish expatriate sportspeople in Italy
Spanish expatriate sportspeople in Belgium
Spanish expatriate sportspeople in Cyprus